American Kickboxer (also known as American Kickboxer 1) is a 1991 South African-American martial arts action film directed by Frans Nel and written by Emil Kolbe, based on an original story by the film's lead actor, John Barrett.

Plot
Robert James "B.J." Quinn (John Barrett) is the current middleweight kickboxing champion of the world ready to face his next opponent, Chad Hunter (Keith Vitali). Hunter proves to be quite the opponent with his impressive skills but in the second round Quinn accidentally hits Chad with an elbow while going for a spinning back fist, causing the doctor to stop the fight. Quinn retains his title.

At a party celebrating a new sponsor to kickboxing, middleweight contender and cocky fighter Jacques Denard (Brad Morris) hits on Quinn's girlfriend Carol (Terry Norton). Quinn, seeing what Denard is doing, begins to confront him. As the two begin to push each other, party goer Ken (Gavin Hood) tries to split them up. However, Quinn punches Ken so hard that he crashes through a table and dies. At the trial, despite Chad's testimony that Quinn would have needed a reason to kill Ken, Denard's testimony proves enough to get Quinn convicted for twelve months on manslaughter charges and is no longer allowed to compete in professional kickboxing.

A year later Quinn is released from prison. Upon returning, he is shocked to learn that Denard has become the middleweight champion. Denard proves to be a complete showboating type who resorts to using dirty tactics and has felt both the ire of kickboxing promoter Bob Wiser (Len Sparrowhawk) and the heckling of journalist Willard (Ted Le Plat), who did the same to Quinn during his days as a champion.

Meanwhile, Quinn learns that Chad Hunter had stood up for him during the trial and befriends him. Chad is up for a title shot against Denard and asks Quinn to train him and Quinn agrees. During a sparring session Quinn gets too rough with Chad, who confronts him. Quinn, harboring anger towards Denard, begins to take his frustrations out on both Chad and Carol. Chad loses badly to Denard in their title fight and is sent to the hospital, where Quinn again fights with Chad. At another party, Quinn drunkenly confronts Denard and beats him relentlessly using a chair, prompting Carol to leave him.

Depressed and alone, Quinn finds another place to live and slowly begins to realize his mistakes. Chad, who has ultimately forgiven Quinn, asks Quinn to help out at his school. On Quinn's first day he witnesses an older and more skilled student send a less skilled students hard to the mat, resulting in a pushing and shoving match which Quinn breaks up. Quinn teaches the less skilled student to counter side kick, and after defusing the situation between the two students, Quinn again begins to value what he has and begins a road of redemption for himself through training. Carol returns and she and Quinn rekindle their relationship. Denard, upset from the beating at the party, decides to challenge Quinn to a fight. However, knowing that Quinn cannot fight as a professional, Denard makes the challenge for $100,000.

Carol tells Quinn she will help him through the challenge, and Chad offers to become Quinn's trainer. With the help of Chad and former trainer Howard (Roger Yuan), Quinn prepares for the big fight.

At the fight, Denard's dirty tactics begin to take its toll on Quinn. When Quinn goes down during one of the later rounds, he gets up at a nine-count. Showing he isn't holding back anymore, he surprises Denard with his punches and kicks. When he lands a haymaker, Denard is sent flying to the corner. Quinn unleashes a flurry of kicks to Denard and ends it with a tornado kick, sending Denard to the ground for the ten-count. As Chad, Howard, Carol, and others gather to congratulate Quinn, Willard makes one more heckle towards Denard before Denard's cornerman knocks him out with a punch.

Cast
 John Barrett as Robert James "B.J." Quinn
 Keith Vitali as Chad Hunter
 Terry Norton as Carol Quinn
 Brad Morris as Jacques Denard
 Roger Yuan as Howard
 Ted Le Plat as Willard
 Len Sparrowhawk as Bob Wiser
 Gavin Hood as Ken
 Patrick Lyster as Prosecutor
 Larry Martin as Judge Rivers
 Gary Chalmers as Attorney
 Jeff Fannell as Dick
 Alex von Reumont as Jerry
 Tom Agnew as Adrian Holligan Sr.
 Judd Lasarow as Adrian Holligan Jr.
 Zia Garfield as Daley Adams
 Graham Clarke as Alex Bone
 Caroline Smart as Doreen
 Mark Mulder as Eugene
 Deon Stewardson as Jim, Sports Editor

Production
The film was shot in South Africa in late 1990 when martial arts films were becoming popular to shoot there for budgetary reasons. It is believed that the film is set in California, despite its South African location and supporting cast.

Sequels
In 1993, two sequels to the film were released. American Kickboxer 2 was shot on location in the Philippines and starred another former kickboxing champion, Dale 'Apollo' Cook. It was a sequel in name only and featured Cook as a cop who is forced to team up with his ex-wife's former boyfriend, a martial arts instructor, to save his ex-wife's daughter.

However, the true sequel to this film is entitled To the Death. It was directed by Darrell Roodt and featured John Barrett as the newly titled "Rick Quinn" and Michel Qissi replacing Brad Morris as Jacques Denard, who starts out as Quinn's rival but ultimately becomes his ally when he is forced into a series of fights to the death by a ruthless promoter.

Release
The film was released theatrically in South Africa on March 1, 1991. The film never received a theatrical release in the United States, but Cannon Films released the film on home video on July 24, 1991.

In 2022, the streaming service Swissx TV offered NFT ownership of American Kickboxer to commemorate its 30th anniversary.

References

External links
 

1991 films
1990s action films
1991 martial arts films
American martial arts films
American action films
English-language South African films
South African action films
Golan-Globus films
Martial arts tournament films
1990s English-language films
1990s American films